Alegre Majagual is the first album by the Colombian musical group Los Corraleros de Majagual. It was released in 1962 on the Discos Fuentes label as LP 0079. The album's liner notes described it as the first jam session in a costeña style.

The members of the original group contributing to the album were Calixto Ochoa (humorous antics), Alfredo Gutiérrez (accordion), Tobias Garces (trombone), and César Castro (vocal).

Antonio Fuentes was the producer, and Jose Maria Fuentes was the sound engineer.

Track listing
Side 1
 Se Salió el Toro (fandango) [César Castro]
 La Nata (pasealto) [Calixto Ochoa]
 Paloma Guarumera (pasaje) [Alfredo Gutiérrez]
 La trombona (gaita) [Enrique Bonfante]
 La Ombligona (pasealto) [Calixto Ochoa]
 Rabo Largo (porra) [Alfredo Gutiérrez]

Side 2
 Ana Felicia (pasaje) [Alfredo Gutiérrez]
 Cielito Azul (merengue) [Calixto Ochoa]
 La Cachuchona (cumbia) [César Castro]
 Majagual (porro) [Alfredo Gutiérrez]
 El Muerto Borracho (paseo) [Calixto Ochoa]
 El Dentista (guaracha) [Calixto Ochoa]

References

External links
 Complete album, licensed to YouTube by Altafonte Network S.L., Sunflower Entertainment Co., Inc on behalf of Discos Fuentes

Los Corraleros de Majagual albums
1962 albums
Spanish-language albums
Discos Fuentes albums